Kota Brahmins are a Hindu Brahmin subcaste mainly from the Indian state of Karnataka. Kota Brahmins take their name from their native village Kota. They speak a Kannada different from the other regional dialects. Kota Brahmins are mainly concentrated in the villages of Kota of Udupi district. Kotas follow Smarta tradition. The Guru Narasimha Temple, Saligrama is important to them.

See also 
 Kannada Brahmins

References

External links 

Kootabandhu.org
Boloji.com

Kannada Brahmins
Mangalorean society
Brahmin communities of Karnataka